By the Book is a 2013 comedy short film directed and written by Milan J. Glavies.

Synopsis
Still reeling from being dumped, best friends Leo and Kate decide the best way to get over their exes is to rebound with each other. With a misguided self-help book as their handbook to happiness, the pair find love where they least expected.

Reception
The film was named Best Supporting Short Film at the Short Sweet Film Festival, named Best Comedy at the Film Outside the Frame Festival, and was an Official Selection at the L.A. Indie Film Festival.   The film’s director received a nomination for Best Director at the Film Outside the Frame Festival.

Cast
Victoria Cyr as Karen Molkovski
Christian Edsall as Leo Merritt
Brenda Kate as Kate Lowry
Trip Langley as Miles Sterling
Vanessa Patel 	as Jo Patel

References

External links
 
By the Book on Vimeo 

2013 films
American independent films
2013 comedy films
American comedy short films
2013 short films
2013 independent films
2010s English-language films
2010s American films